Blowin' Up is a comedic reality show on MTV. The show stars Jamie Kennedy, an actor who follows his dream of becoming a successful rapper. The show was written by Kennedy after the success of the movie Malibu's Most Wanted, in which he starred. Along for the ride is his close friend Stu Stone, who keeps Jamie in check to stick to their rap career.

Throughout the show there are various celebrity appearances. From the beginning, Jamie expresses his dislike for fellow actor Jason Biggs (who like Kennedy appeared in Kevin Smith's 2001 film Jay and Silent Bob Strike Back). Jamie and Stu also encounter many different rappers during the season, including Mike Jones, Ice-T, and a performance with the Three 6 Mafia. Jamie and Stu also try to recruit special guests on their album, getting Bob Saget formerly of the TV show Full House. The song was titled "Rollin' with Saget."

Robin Sloan Bechtel, an executive at Warner Bros. Records discovered Jamie Kennedy and Stu Stone's music on MySpace before the MTV show was greenlit. When she met with Kennedy and Stone, they all discussed pitching a show that would tell the story of their rap ventures.  After MTV greenlit the show, Bechtel signed the duo and starred in their show. An album featuring the tracks recorded during the filming of Blowin' Up, sharing a title of the same name, was released on July 11, 2006. Some of the songs include "Circle Circle Dot Dot," "Rollin' With Saget," "1984," and "Crooked Stick." In the early popularity of YouTube, a fan created a lego inspired video for Circle Circle Dot Dot that hit the homepage of YouTube and Perezhilton.com which catapulted the video to #1 status on YouTube. Circle Circle Dot Dot then became an internet phenomenon and was a #1 ringtone.

Blowin' Up album

Track listing
 Circle Circle Dot Dot
 A Message From Bob
 Rollin' with Saget
 1984
 Rush the club (feat. Kardinal Offishall)
 Crooked Stick
 Flirt
 I Don't Want Beef
 Knuckle Up
 Car Rear
 Mattress Mack (feat. Paul Wall)
 Blane's Story
 Bologna
 Fuck Jamie Kennedy (feat. E-40 and Jason Biggs)
 Celebrity Stalker
 Strip Club Dummy
 Message from Iceberg
 Guns (Gill T. Pleasure, Jamie Kennedy & Stu Stone)

The album was executive produced by Jamie Kennedy and Robin Bechtel and produced by Stu Stone.

Credits
 Jamie Kennedy – vocals
 Stu Stone – vocals, arranger, producer
 Ely "Creepy" Rise – keyboards
 Richard "Younglord" Frierson – arranger, producer
 Kardinal Offishall – vocals, arranger, producer
 Justin Trugman – producer, engineer
 Ryan West – engineer
 Robin Sloan Bechtel – executive producer
 Brothers Rise – producer
 Yuri Katz – engineer, mixer
 DJ Joey Nicks – producer
 Jamie Rise – producer, engineer, executive producer
 Chris Bellman – mastering
 Scott Levitin – mastering
 Paul Wall – vocals

Episode list
 1.01 – Dope-Ass Rapper
 1.02 – Law & Disorderlies
 1.03 – Grillz
 1.04 – Up Your #@&%
 1.05 – Do It Yourself
 1.06 – The Breakup (A.K.A. Starting Over)
 1.07 – Guilty Pleasure
 1.08 – Deal With It

See also
 Jamie Kennedy
 Malibu's Most Wanted

References

External links
 Jamie Kennedy & Stu Stone Album Site

2000s American reality television series
2006 American television series debuts
2007 American television series endings
MTV original programming
Albums produced by Kardinal Offishall
2006 albums